Maynards Bassetts is a UK brand of confectionery owned by Mondelez International, introduced in 2016. The brand was created to merge its existing Maynards and Bassett's brands, which the company came to own following its purchase of Cadbury in 2010.

Products
Maynards Wine Gums

Maynards Wine Pastilles
Maynards Wine Sours 
Maynards Sports Mixture
Maynards Mini Gems (renamed from Midget Gems in 2022).
Maynards Wine Gums Light
Maynards Swedish Berries
Maynards Fuzzy Peaches
Maynards Swedish Fish
Maynards Sour Cherry Blasters
Maynards Sour Watermelons
Maynards Sour Patch Kids
Maynards Ultra Sour Patch Kids
Maynards Sour Patch Kids Soda Popz (UK only)
Maynards Sour Chillers
Maynards Juicy Squirts Berry
Maynards Blush Berries
Maynards Blackberry Bushels
Maynards Orange Twists
Maynards Sour Grapes
Maynards Granny Smith

 Liquorice Allsorts
 Fruit Allsorts
 Dessert Allsorts
 Sports Mixture
 Jelly Babies
 Milky Babies
 Fruity Babies
 Party Babies
 Sherbet Lemons
 Fruit Bonbons
 Lemon Bonbons
 Pear Drops
 Dolly mixture
 Sweetshop Favourites
 Murray Mints
 Mint Creams
 Mint Favourites
 Traditional Wine Gums (discontinued)
 Traditional Wine Gums (New recipe...)
 Imperials
 Imperials Spearmint
 Everton Mints
 Animal Mix
 Snakes
 Sour Squirms
 and assorted toffees

References

Cadbury brands
Mondelez International brands